Albert Joseph Maria Ehrhard (14 March 1862 – 23 September 1940) was a German Catholic theologian, church historian and Byzantinist. He was the author of numerous works on Early Christianity.

Biography
Born in Herbitzheim (Alsace), Ehrhard studied theology at Würzburg and Münster, being ordained as a priest in 1885, then received his doctorate of theology in 1888. From 1889 he served as a professor of dogmatics at the Roman Catholic seminary in Strasbourg. From 1892 to 1898 he was a professor of church history at the University of Würzburg, and afterwards held professorships in Vienna (from 1898), Freiburg (from 1902) and Strasbourg (from 1903), where in 1911/12 he served as university rector. From 1920 to 1927 he was a professor of church history at the University of Bonn.

He died in Bonn aged 78.

Selected works
 Die altchristliche Literatur und ihre Erforschung seit 1880 (1894) – Early Christian literature and its research since 1880.
 Die altchristliche Litteratur und ihre Erforschung von 1884-1900 (1894) – Early Christian literature and its research from 1884 to 1900. 
 Forschungen zur hagiographie der griechischen kirche, vornehmlich auf grund der hagiographischen handschriften von Mailand (1897) – Research involving the hagiography of the Greek church.
 Geschichte der byzantinischen Litteratur (with Karl Krumbacher, Heinrich Gelzer, 1897) – History of Byzantine literature.
 Der Katholizismus und das zwanzigste Jahrhundert im Lichte der kirchlichen Entwicklung der Neuzeit (1902) – Catholicism and the twentieth century in the light of ecclesiastical development in the modern age. 
 Die Griechischen Martyrien (1907) – The Greek martyrs.
 Das Mittelalter und seine kirchliche Entwickelung (1908) – The Middle Ages and ecclesiastical development.
 Urchristentum und Katholizismus : drei Vorträge (1926) – Early Christianity and Catholicism: three lectures. 
 Das Christentum im Römischen Reich bis Konstantin (1932) – Christianity in the Roman Empire prior to Constantine the Great.
 Die Kirche der Märtyer; ihre Aufgaben und ihre Leistungen (1932) – The church of the martyrs.
 Urkirche und Frühkatholizismus (1935) – The early Church and early Catholicism.

References 

1862 births
1940 deaths
People from Bas-Rhin
University of Würzburg alumni
Academic staff of the University of Würzburg
University of Münster alumni
Academic staff of the University of Bonn
Academic staff of the University of Vienna
Academic staff of the University of Strasbourg
Academic staff of the University of Freiburg
19th-century German Catholic theologians
20th-century German Catholic theologians
Historians of Christianity
German Byzantinists
German historians of religion
Scholars of Byzantine theology